The 2010 Belmont Stakes was the 142nd running of the Belmont Stakes. The race took place on June 5, 2010, and was won by Drosselmeyer, who was ridden by jockey Mike Smith and trained by Bill Mott. It was televised in the United States on the ABC television network.

As the final jewel in the United States Triple Crown of Thoroughbred Racing, the race was run without the elusive championship at stake due to 2010 Kentucky Derby winner Super Saver's loss in the Preakness Stakes. Both the Kentucky Derby and Preakness winners did not run in the race. Uptowncharlybrown finished fifth, but was disqualified and placed last due to losing the eight pound handicapping weight on the backstretch.

 $1 Exacta (7–5): $144.50
 $1 Trifecta (7–5–11): $766.00
 $1 Superfecta (7–5–11–8): $10,658.00

See also 
 2010 Kentucky Derby
 2010 Preakness Stakes

References

External links 
 
 

2010
2010 in horse racing
2010 in American sports
2010 in sports in New York (state)